is Japanese voice actress and singer Maaya Uchida's 3rd single, released on April 1, 2015. The titular song from the single was used as the ending theme for the anime Comical Psychosomatic Medicine.

Track listings

Charts

Event 
 『 Maaya Party！Vol.3』　Maaya Uchida 3rd Single Release Event「Maaya Party！Vol.3」（April 11, 2015 - April 18, 2015：Tokyo, Aichi, Osaka）

Album

References

2015 singles
2015 songs
J-pop songs
Japanese-language songs
Pony Canyon singles
Anime songs